Albert Henry Collings, RBA (1868 – 6 May 1947) was an English artist most notable for his portraiture.

Life and work 

Collings was born, trained, and lived all his life in London. Working in oils, water-colour, and pastel, he specialised in figure subjects and portraits, for which he received a number of official commissions. He exhibited for many years at the Royal Society of British Artists, showing a total of 98 works and being elected a member in 1897. He also supported the Royal Academy (29 works, 1896–1938) and the Royal Institute of Painters in Water Colours, and showed at the Paris Salon, where he was awarded a gold medal for a portrait in 1907.

In 1911 Collings painted in oils the portrait of the Unionist MP for East Herts, Mr Abel Smith, which was presented to Abel Smith by his friends.

A picture by Collings exhibited at the Brighton Museum & Art Gallery in 1926 attracted attention in The Times reporting:

Examples of his portraiture are at Harrow and in the Theatre Royal, Drury Lane, and Portsmouth Town Hall; but for such a fluent and relatively prolific artist, his work is now rare.

Painted the portrait of J.A.Harrison hon. secretary of The Eccentric Club in 1929.

Collings was a member of The Savage Club.

He exhibited at the Royal Society of British Artists what was dubbed 'a pretty head' by The Times''' art critic in 1909.

 Exhibitions 

Arlington Gallery, Bond Street, London - 1934

 Gallery 

 Notes 

 References The Times, Monday, Jul 31, 1911; pg. 11; Issue 39651The Times, Monday, Oct 11, 1926; pg. 17; Issue 44399The Times, Monday, May 25, 1936; pg. 9; Issue 47383The Times'', Monday, Dec 02, 1929; pg. 14; Issue 45375

External links
 

1868 births
1947 deaths
19th-century English painters
English male painters
Members of the Royal Society of British Artists
20th-century English painters
English watercolourists
English portrait painters
Landscape artists
English illustrators
19th-century English male artists
20th-century English male artists